The Fiddley Foodle Bird is a British children's animated musical series written by Jonathan Hodge, and narrated by Bruce Forsyth. Thirteen episodes of the series were made in total, with one story continuing through the episodes. They were made in 1991 and broadcast in 1992 on BBC One at 4:15. It was produced by H.A.P.P.Y. Animation and Fiddley Foodle Bird Productions in association with HIT Entertainment and was broadcast in over 30 different countries worldwide. The show also continued airing on the BBC until 2001.

Plot
The main character of the series is a bird, whose full name is the "Fiddley Foodle Bim Bam Boodle Oo Diddley-Doodle Oodle Bird". The character is voiced by Dennis Waterman (actor and singer famous for his roles as Terry McCann in Minder and Detective Sergeant George Carter in The Sweeney). The bird was originally nothing more than just a picture in a book, which was found by a young boy named Algernon. He wished that the bird would come to life, and when the wish came true they set out on an adventure with Algernon's friends, the eternally hungry Princess Toto, and his housekeeper, the overly strict Mrs. Grumblebaum. The aim of the mission is to find Algernon's lost parents, two members of the Potty Explorer's Club- Carzy and Maudy. They were lost exploring in a sieve. However, Algernon's dastardly Uncle Arbathnot is out to ensure that their mission does not succeed, and also to seize a mysterious treasure chest. He is assisted by a muscle-man named Damage, a Frenchman named Flannel, and a pirate named Pierre Head, who, like most pirates, is accompanied by a parrot – a wise-cracking green glove puppet. The show features a guest appearance from Cilla Black, who voiced the President of the Potty Explorer's Club.

Episodes
Foodle Power (8 January 1992)
Sea Saw (15 January 1992)
Cock-a-Doodle Crazy (22 January 1992)
The Yolks on Who? (29 January 1992)
Catch My Drift (5 February 1992)
Up the Pole (12 February 1992)
There's No Business Like Snow Business (19 February 1992)
What the Dino Saw (26 February 1992)
Hic Hic Wooray (4 March 1992)
Goin' Bananas (11 March 1992)
Planks a Lot (18 March 1992)
Squids In (25 March 1992)
Will Ee No Come Back Again? (1 April 1992)

Voices
 Dennis Waterman – Fiddley Foodle Bird
 Bruce Forsyth – Narrator
 Kate Robbins – Mrs. Grumblebaum
 Jimmy Hibbert
 Jonathan Hodge
 Julian Littman
 Stuart Leathwood
 Tammy Coleman

Merchandise

Video releases
The entire series was released on a set of VHS recordings in 2001. There was also another video released by Pocket Money Video which contained the first eight episodes.

Music release
A soundtrack of the series was also released on CD and cassette which contained the introduction by Bruce Forsyth, a full extended version of the main title theme song and all of the songs that were featured in all thirteen episodes of the series. It was released by EMI Music Publishing in 1992, the same year as when the show first aired.

Credits
Based on the Original Story by: Jonathan Hodge
Written by: Jonathan Hodge & Stuart Leathwood
Scripts by: Don Arioli, Jonathan Hodge, Stuart Leathwood
Title Song by: Jonathan Hodge & Bob Saker
Original Songs by: Jonathan Hodge, Stuart Leathwood, Julian Littman
Incidental Music by: Jonathan Hodge & Julian Littman
Produced by: Jonathan Hodge
Music Recorded at: Honeywood Studios
Voice Recordings by: Ian Gillespie at Silk Sound
Animation by: Whizzline Productions, Clinton J. Priest, Nick Love-Gittins, Stephen Hales, Billy Allison, Simon Turner, Paul Smith, Denise Smith, Bob Smith, Malc Smith
Overseas Animation by: Shanghai Morning Sun Animation Co., Ltd.
Overseas Animation Directors: Horseman Cao
Design Storyboards and Layouts: Vince James, Jeremy Lounge, Miss Spomin
Backgrounds: Aileen Raistrick
Line Testing and Xerox: Lynn Durans, Kate Smith
Co-ordination: Karina Stanford, Margaret Johnson
Paint and Trace Supervisor: Louise Harding
Paint and Trace: Michael Ambler, Anne Marie Briggs, Damian Knapper, David McGuire, Russel Marshall, Greg Smith, Paul Murphey, Sharon Walsh, Fabian White, Tanya Blosen
Production Manager: Heather Pedley, Tyne Tees Facilities
Sound: John Cook, Charles Heath
Editing: Paul Rudkin
Rostrum Camera: Glynis Werndly
Supervising Cameraman: Alec Jacklin
Executive Producer for the BBC: Theresa Plummer Andrews
Executive Producer for HIT Entertainment: Peter Orton
Executive Producers for H.A.P.P.Y. Productions: Chris Ambler & Andy Taylor
Directed by: Tony Garth
Produced by: Jonathan Hodge
An H.A.P.P.Y. Production
© 1991 Fiddley Foodle Bird Productions Ltd

References

External links
 
 The Fiddley Foodle Bird on toonhound.com

1992 British television series debuts
1992 British television series endings
1990s British animated television series
1990s British children's television series
British children's animated fantasy television series
British children's animated musical television series
English-language television shows
BBC children's television shows
Television series by Mattel Creations
Animated television series about birds